Kidder Township may refer to the following townships in the United States:

 Kidder Township, Carbon County, Pennsylvania
 Kidder Township, Caldwell County, Missouri